The 1981 Holy Cross Crusaders football team was an American football team that represented the College of the Holy Cross as an independent during the 1982 NCAA Division I-AA football season.

In their second year under head coach Rick E. Carter, the Crusaders compiled an 8–3 record. Terry Malone and Doug O'Donnell were the team captains.

This was the Crusaders' first year in Division I-AA, after having competed in the top-level Division I-A and its predecessors since 1896.

A four-game winning streak to open the campaign put Holy Cross in the weekly national rankings in its first year in Division I-AA, rising as high as No. 4. The Crusaders ended the year ranked No. 13, following a rivalry loss to Tangerine Bowl-bound Boston College of Division I-A. 

Holy Cross played its home games at Fitton Field on the college campus in Worcester, Massachusetts.

Schedule

References

Holy Cross
Holy Cross Crusaders football seasons
Holy Cross Crusaders football